Carbrook may refer to:

 Carbrook, Queensland, a suburb of Logan City, Australia
 Carbrook, Sheffield, a district of Sheffield, South Yorkshire, England
 Carbrook Ravine, a nature reserve in Sheffield, South Yorkshire, England

See also
 Carbrooke, a village in Norfolk, England